MIAT  may refer to:
 MIAT Mongolian Airlines
 MIAT (museum), a textile and industry museum in Belgium
 MIAT (gene), a long non-coding RNA gene

Miat may refer to :
 an alternative name for the plant Memecylon edule